Diana Dew (June 25, 1943 – February 2008), was an American fashion designer recognized in the '60s for pioneering electronic clothes (or e-textiles). She created clothing that was able to light up, was battery powered, and was controlled via a switch.

Early life
Diana Dew was born on June 25, 1943, in Memphis, Tennessee. From the age of four to fourteen, she worked as a fashion model and attended the Memphis Academy of Art (now Memphis College of Art). She spent a year at Bard College studying method acting before moving to the University of Florida to study engineering. Dew temporarily created stage costumes for Memphis' Front Street Theater before moving to California and enrolling at the University of California, Berkeley. She rapidly got disillusioned with the counterculture environment, rejecting LSD because it "becomes your usual rhythm, and then you're still looking for something new."

Fashion design
Dew returned to New York City, where she "created the East Side folk music scene" and dressed Joan Baez. She then moved to Boston and started Isis, a bespoke dress business on Harvard Square, but she was unable to attract a young customer that could afford her high-end creations. After a suggestion from a modeling agency, she became a designer for Puritan's Paraphernalia business in the late summer of 1966, and later ruled over her own company, Experipuritaneous. Dew's designs encapsulated the mentality of the 1960s, stylistically fusing two modern institutions: the psychedelic realm of counterculture and the future and revolutionary field of space exploration.

Her creations, which were powered by rechargeable nickel-cadmium batteries, could stay lit for up to 5 hours. The pace of the strobe-like flash, which projected a psychedelic light display, was controlled through a potentiometer worn at the waist. Her creations, which she intended to be "like an LSD trip without the hang-ups," premiered in February 1967 at the Paraphernalia store in New York City for more than $150 apiece.

Dew rose to prominence as a musician's costume designer. She designed clothes for the trippy band the Blues Magoos that would light up as the music became louder on stage. One of these outfits is presently housed in a Smithsonian Institution time capsule, which will be opened in 2065 as an example of 1960s art. 

Dew's work was featured in the seminal show "Body Covering" at the Museum of Contemporary Craft in New York City in 1968, which explored the link between technology and clothing.

Later life, death, and legacy
After a brief tenure with Creamcheese, an all-female rock band that performed in Dew's designs, Dew devoted her time and energy to hydroponic sprout cultivation and raising her three boys. She was married three times to different people. In February 2008, she died at home and was cremated. She was survived by her sons.

Images of her fashion are included in the National Museum of American History archives. One of her dresses was featured on the American PBS television program, Antiques Roadshow (season 24, episode 12).

See also 

 Tiger Morse

References

1943 births
2008 deaths
American fashion designers
People from Memphis, Tennessee
American women fashion designers
1960s fashion
20th-century American women